Żurawiec may refer to the following places:
Żurawiec, Śrem County in Greater Poland Voivodeship (west-central Poland)
Żurawiec, Lublin Voivodeship (east Poland)
Żurawiec, Warmian-Masurian Voivodeship (north Poland)